Spilichneumon is a genus of ichneumon wasps in the family Ichneumonidae. There are at least 30 described species in Spilichneumon.

Species
These 33 species belong to the genus Spilichneumon:

 Spilichneumon ammonius (Gravenhorst, 1820) c g
 Spilichneumon anurus (Thomson, 1888) c g
 Spilichneumon borealis (Provancher, 1882) c g
 Spilichneumon bronteus (Cresson, 1864) c g
 Spilichneumon celenae Perkins, 1953 c g
 Spilichneumon celsiae (Tischbein, 1878) c g
 Spilichneumon darjeelingensis Cameron, 1905 c g
 Spilichneumon doii Uchida, 1930 c g
 Spilichneumon flavicornis (Kiss, 1933) c g
 Spilichneumon genalis Horstmann & Yu, 1999 c g
 Spilichneumon inconstans (Cresson, 1864) c g
 Spilichneumon jezoensis Uchida, 1926 c g
 Spilichneumon johansoni (Holmgren, 1871) c g
 Spilichneumon juxtus (Cresson, 1864) c g
 Spilichneumon kodiakensis (Ashmead, 1902) c
 Spilichneumon limnophilus (Thomson, 1888) c g
 Spilichneumon nigrifrons (Holmgren, 1878) c g
 Spilichneumon nubivagus (Cresson, 1867) c g
 Spilichneumon obater (Kokujev, 1909) c g
 Spilichneumon occisorius (Fabricius, 1793) c g
 Spilichneumon pelloponesius Heinrich, 1972 c g
 Spilichneumon pernigricornis Heinrich, 1971 c g
 Spilichneumon physcoteloides Heinrich, 1961 c g
 Spilichneumon pici (Berthoumieu, 1894) c g
 Spilichneumon primarius (Kokujev, 1909) c g
 Spilichneumon pygmaeus Heinrich, 1978 c g
 Spilichneumon simplicidens (Thomson, 1888) c g
 Spilichneumon spilosomae (Mocsary, 1886) c g
 Spilichneumon superbus (Provancher, 1886) c g
 Spilichneumon taos (Cresson, 1877) c g
 Spilichneumon tennecabunensis (Heinrich, 1929) c g
 Spilichneumon valdetypicus Heinrich, 1961 c g
 Spilichneumon victoriae Heinrich, 1965 c g

Data sources: i = ITIS, c = Catalogue of Life, g = GBIF, b = Bugguide.net

References

Further reading

External links

 

Ichneumoninae